Periasamy Thiagarajan was an Indian politician. He was elected to the Lok Sabha, the lower house of the Parliament of India from Sivaganga, Tamil Nadu as a member of the AIADMK.

References

External links
Official biographical sketch in Parliament of India website

1939 births
All India Anna Dravida Munnetra Kazhagam politicians
Dravida Munnetra Kazhagam politicians
India MPs 1977–1979
2008 deaths